The Atanasoff–Berry computer (ABC) was the first automatic electronic digital computer. Limited by the technology of the day, and execution, the device has remained somewhat obscure. The ABC's priority is debated among historians of computer technology, because it was neither programmable, nor Turing-complete. Conventionally, the ABC would be considered the first electronic ALU (arithmetic logic unit) which is integrated into every modern processor's design. 

Its unique contribution was to make computing faster by being the first to use vacuum tubes to do the arithmetic calculations. Prior to this, slower electro-mechanical methods were used by Konrad Zuse's Z1 computer, and the simultaneously developed Harvard Mark I. The first electronic, programmable, digital machine, the Colossus computer from 1943 to 1945, used similar tube-based technology as ABC.

Overview
Conceived in 1937, the machine was built by Iowa State College mathematics and physics professor John Vincent Atanasoff with the help of graduate student Clifford Berry. It was designed only to solve systems of linear equations and was successfully tested in 1942. However, its intermediate result storage mechanism, a paper card writer/reader, was not perfected, and when John Vincent Atanasoff left Iowa State College for World War II assignments, work on the machine was discontinued. The ABC pioneered important elements of modern computing, including binary arithmetic and electronic switching elements,  but its special-purpose nature and lack of a changeable, stored program distinguish it from modern computers. The computer was designated an IEEE Milestone in 1990.

Atanasoff and Berry's computer work was not widely known until it was rediscovered in the 1960s, amidst patent disputes over the first instance of an electronic computer. At that time ENIAC, that had been created by John Mauchly and J. Presper Eckert, was considered to be the first computer in the modern sense, but in 1973 a U.S. District Court invalidated the ENIAC patent and concluded that the ENIAC inventors had derived the subject matter of the electronic digital computer from Atanasoff. When, in the mid-1970s, the secrecy surrounding the British World War II development of the Colossus computers that pre-dated ENIAC, was lifted and Colossus was described at a conference in Los Alamos, New Mexico, in June 1976, John Mauchly and Konrad Zuse were reported to have been astonished.

Design and construction

According to Atanasoff's account, several key principles of the Atanasoff–Berry computer were conceived in a sudden insight after a long nighttime drive to Rock Island, Illinois, during the winter of 1937–38. The ABC innovations included electronic computation, binary arithmetic, parallel processing, regenerative capacitor memory, and a separation of memory and computing functions. The mechanical and logic design was worked out by Atanasoff over the next year. A grant application to build a proof of concept prototype was submitted in March 1939 to the Agronomy department, which was also interested in speeding up computation for economic and research analysis. $5,000 of further funding to complete the machine came from the nonprofit Research Corporation of New York City.

The ABC was built by Atanasoff and Berry in the basement of the physics building at Iowa State College during 1939–1942. The initial funds were released in September, and the 11-tube prototype was first demonstrated in October 1939. A December demonstration prompted a grant for construction of the full-scale machine. The ABC was built and tested over the next two years. A January 15, 1941, story in the Des Moines Register announced the ABC as "an electrical computing machine" with more than 300 vacuum tubes that would "compute complicated algebraic equations" (but gave no precise technical description of the computer).

It was not programmable, which distinguishes it from more general machines of the same era, such as Konrad Zuse's 1941 Z3 (or earlier iterations) and the Colossus computers of 1943–1945. Nor did it implement the stored-program architecture, first implemented in the Manchester Baby of 1948, required for fully general-purpose practical computing machines.

The machine was, however, the first to implement:
Using vacuum tubes, rather than wheels, ratchets, mechanical switches, or telephone relays, allowing for greater speed than previous computers
Using capacitors for memory, rather than mechanical components, allowing for greater speed and density

The memory of the Atanasoff–Berry computer was a system called regenerative capacitor memory, which consisted of a pair of drums, each containing 1600 capacitors that rotated on a common shaft once per second. The capacitors on each drum were organized into 32 "bands" of 50 (30 active bands and two spares in case a capacitor failed), giving the machine a speed of 30 additions/subtractions per second. Data was represented as 50-bit binary fixed-point numbers. The electronics of the memory and arithmetic units could store and operate on 60 such numbers at a time (3000 bits).

The alternating current power-line frequency of 60 Hz was the primary clock rate for the lowest-level operations.

The arithmetic logic functions were fully electronic, implemented with vacuum tubes. The family of logic gates ranged from inverters to two- and three-input gates. The input and output levels and operating voltages were compatible between the different gates. Each gate consisted of one inverting vacuum-tube amplifier, preceded by a resistor divider input network that defined the logical function. The control logic functions, which only needed to operate once per drum rotation and therefore did not require electronic speed, were electromechanical, implemented with relays.

The ALU operated on only one bit of each number at a time; it kept the carry/borrow bit in a capacitor for use in the next AC cycle.

Although the Atanasoff–Berry computer was an important step up from earlier calculating machines, it was not able to run entirely automatically through an entire problem. An operator was needed to operate the control switches to set up its functions, much like the electro-mechanical calculators and unit record equipment of the time. Selection of the operation to be performed, reading, writing, converting to or from binary to decimal, or reducing a set of equations was made by front-panel switches and, in some cases, jumpers.

There were two forms of input and output: primary user input and output and an intermediate results output and input. The intermediate results storage allowed operation on problems too large to be handled entirely within the electronic memory. (The largest problem that could be solved without the use of the intermediate output and input was two simultaneous equations, a trivial problem.)

Intermediate results were binary, written onto paper sheets by electrostatically modifying the resistance at 1500 locations to represent 30 of the 50-bit numbers (one equation). Each sheet could be written or read in one second. The reliability of the system was limited to about 1 error in 100,000 calculations by these units, primarily attributed to lack of control of the sheets' material characteristics. In retrospect, a solution could have been to add a parity bit to each number as written. This problem was not solved by the time Atanasoff left the university for war-related work.

Primary user input was decimal, via standard IBM 80-column punched cards, and output was decimal, via a front-panel display.

Function
The ABC was designed for a specific purpose the solution of systems of simultaneous linear equations. It could handle systems with up to 29 equations, a difficult problem for the time. Problems of this scale were becoming common in physics, the department in which John Atanasoff worked. The machine could be fed two linear equations with up to 29 variables and a constant term and eliminate one of the variables. This process would be repeated manually for each of the equations, which would result in a system of equations with one fewer variable. Then the whole process would be repeated to eliminate another variable.

George W. Snedecor, the head of Iowa State's Statistics Department, was very likely the first user of an electronic digital computer to solve real-world mathematics problems. He submitted many of these problems to Atanasoff.

Patent dispute
On June 26, 1947, J. Presper Eckert and John Mauchly were the first to file for patent on a digital computing device (ENIAC), much to the surprise of Atanasoff. The ABC had been examined by John Mauchly in June 1941, and Isaac Auerbach, a former student of Mauchly's, alleged that it influenced his later work on ENIAC, although Mauchly denied this. The ENIAC patent did not issue until 1964, and by 1967 Honeywell sued Sperry Rand in an attempt to break the ENIAC patents, arguing that the ABC constituted prior art. The United States District Court for the District of Minnesota released its judgement on October 19, 1973, finding in Honeywell v. Sperry Rand that the ENIAC patent was a derivative of John Atanasoff's invention.

Campbell-Kelly and Aspray conclude:

The case was legally resolved on October 19, 1973, when U.S. District Judge Earl R. Larson held the ENIAC patent invalid, ruling that the ENIAC derived many basic ideas from the Atanasoff–Berry computer. Judge Larson explicitly stated:

Herman Goldstine, one of the original developers of ENIAC wrote:

Replica
The original ABC was eventually dismantled in 1948, when the university converted the basement to classrooms, and all of its pieces except for one memory drum were discarded.

In 1997, a team of researchers led by Dr. Delwyn Bluhm and John Gustafson from Ames Laboratory (located on the Iowa State University campus) finished building a working replica of the Atanasoff–Berry computer at a cost of $350,000 (equivalent to $ in ).  The replica ABC was on display in the first floor lobby of the Durham Center for Computation and Communication at Iowa State University and was subsequently exhibited at the Computer History Museum.

See also
 History of computing hardware
 List of vacuum-tube computers
 Mikhail Kravchuk

References

Bibliography

External links
The Birth of the ABC
Reconstruction of the ABC, 1994-1997
John Gustafson, Reconstruction of the Atanasoff-Berry Computer
The ENIAC patent trial
Honeywell v. Sperry Rand Records, 1846-1973, Charles Babbage Institute, University of Minnesota.
The Atanasoff-Berry Computer In Operation (YouTube)

1940s computers
One-of-a-kind computers
Vacuum tube computers
Computer-related introductions in 1942
Early computers
Iowa State University
Serial computers